Strategies Against Architecture II is a retrospective double album by experimental artists Einstürzende Neubauten, released in 1991.

Track listing

Disc one
 "Abfackeln"  – 3:30
 "Partynummer" (live)  – 1:35
 "Z.N.S."  – 5:39
 "Die Elektrik (Merle)"  – 2:21
 "Intermezzo/Yü-Gung" (live)  – 6:18
 "Seele Brennt"  – 4:08
 "Blutvergiftung"  – 1:50
 "Sand"  – 3:30
 "Kangolicht"  – 4:14
 "Armenia" (live)  – 4:39
 "Ein Stuhl in der Hölle"  – 2:08

Disc two
 "Vanadium I Ching"  – 4:53
 "Leid und Elend" (live)  – 4:35
 "DNS Wasserturm"  – 6:27
 "Armenia II" (live)  – 3:46
 "Fackeln!"  – 1:56
 "Ich bin's"  – 3:21
 "Hirnlego"  – 3:09
 "Wardrobe"  – 2:39
 "Bildbeschreibung"  – 9:31
 "Haus der Lüge" (live)  – 4:37
 "Jordache"  – 0:28
 "Kein Bestandteil sein" (Alternative Ending)  – 6:43

Notes
The album was also released on double-LP, which did not contain the track "Kein Bestandteil sein (Alternative Ending)."

References

Einstürzende Neubauten compilation albums
1991 compilation albums
Mute Records compilation albums